Oplosia suvorovi is a species of beetle in the family Cerambycidae. It was described by Pic in 1914.

References

Acanthoderini
Beetles described in 1914